Mário Albino Meira Mendonça (born 18 August 1991) is a Portuguese footballer who plays for Vitória de Setúbal as a forward.

Football career
On 14 August 2013, Mendonça made his professional debut with Chaves in a 2013–14 Taça da Liga match against Oliveirense, when he replaced Arnold (80th minute).

References

External links

Stats and profile at LPFP 

1991 births
People from Esposende
Sportspeople from Braga District
Living people
Portuguese footballers
Association football forwards
A.D. Esposende players
G.D. Chaves players
Juventude de Pedras Salgadas players
U.D. Oliveirense players
F.C. Vizela players
C.D. Fátima players
Merelinense F.C. players
GS Loures players
S.C. Beira-Mar players
S.C.U. Torreense players
Vitória F.C. players
Segunda Divisão players
Campeonato de Portugal (league) players
Liga Portugal 2 players